The Church of Scientology has been involved in court disputes in several countries. In some cases, when the Church has initiated the dispute, questions have been raised as to its motives. The Church of Scientology says that its use of the legal system is necessary to protect its intellectual property and its right to freedom of religion. Critics say that most of the organization's legal claims are designed to harass those who criticize it and its manipulative business practices.

In the years since its inception, the Church of Scientology's lawsuits filed against newspapers, magazines, government agencies (including the United States tax collecting unit, the IRS), and individuals have numbered in the thousands. In 1991, Time magazine estimated that the Church spends an average of about $20 million per year on various legal actions, and it is the exclusive client of several law firms.  According to a U.S. District Court Memorandum of Decision in 1993, Scientologists "have abused the federal court system by using it, inter alia, to destroy their opponents, rather than to resolve an actual dispute over trademark law or any other legal matter. This constitutes 'extraordinary, malicious, wanton, and oppressive conduct.' ... It is abundantly clear that plaintiffs sought to harass the individual defendants and destroy the church defendants through massive over-litigation and other highly questionable litigation tactics. The Special Master has never seen a more glaring example of bad faith litigation than this." Rulings such as this have classified the Church of Scientology as a chronically vexatious litigant.  Legal disputes initiated by Scientology against its former members, the media or others include the following:
 Religious discrimination cases, including recognition as a religious organization.
 Copyright infringement cases. Scientology's religious documents are copyrighted, and many are available only to members who pay for higher levels of courses and auditing.
 Libel and slander cases.

In the past, the Church has been involved in criminal court cases (e.g. United States v. Hubbard), but increasingly, lawsuits are being brought by former Church members against the Church, such as:
 human trafficking and forced labor (Claire and Mark Headley v. Church of Scientology International)
  fraud and misrepresentation
 libel (e.g. Hill v. Church of Scientology of Toronto).

The Church's view
Scientologists say that the church's main goal is to be recognized as a religion, which on occasion has met resistance from opponents (including national governments), and this has forced it to have recourse to the courts.

One such area is recognition as an official religion in various governments around the world.  Scientology's path to legal recognition as a religion in New Zealand took 48 years and several lawsuits. Other efforts have had less success. In 1999, the United Kingdom rejected an application for charity status and the attendant tax benefits. The church applied for Canadian tax-exempt status in 1998, was reportedly rejected in 1999, and is not registered as a charity as of 2009. In Austria, the organization withdrew its application to register as a "religious confessional community". The activities of the Church of Scientology are not prohibited or limited in any way in the European Union and Scientology enjoys the full freedom of any church in these countries.

Some governments, however, have labeled the church as a cult. Although the status is not changed and its freedom is not limited, German and Belgian government entities have accused Scientology of violating the human rights of its members and therefore called it a "totalitarian cult" and a "commercial enterprise". In 1995, a parliamentary report in France classified it, along with 172 other religious groups, as a "dangerous cult". In Russia, the government had refused to consider the church for registration as a religious organization, which became the subject of proceedings before the European Court of Human Rights in the case of Church of Scientology Moscow v. Russia. The court decided that Russia's refusal to consider the Church of Scientology's application for registration as a religious community "had been a violation of Article 11 (freedom of assembly and association) of the European Convention on Human Rights read in the light of Article 9 (freedom of thought, conscience and religion)".

L. Ron Hubbard and lawsuits
Critics state that the ultimate aim of Scientology lawsuits is to destroy church opponents by forcing them into bankruptcy or submission, using its resources to pursue frivolous lawsuits at considerable cost to defendants. In doing so, they draw particular attention to certain controversial statements made by the church's founder, L. Ron Hubbard, in the 1950s and 1960s.

In 1994, Scientology attorney Helena Kobrin was fined $17,775 for filing a frivolous lawsuit. U.S. District Court Judge Leonie Brinkema cited a frequently quoted statement of L. Ron Hubbard on the subject in the case of Religious Technology Center vs. The Washington Post, on November 28, 1995:

Critics also allege that the Church uses litigation as a cover for intimidation tactics, such as investigating the criminal records (or lack thereof) of opponents and subjecting them to surveillance and invasive inquiries, both to discourage further criticism and to ensure the opponent's unwillingness to fight the lawsuit. A policy letter by L. Ron Hubbard, distributed in early 1966, says:
This is correct procedure:
 Spot who is attacking us.''
 Start investigating them promptly for FELONIES or worse using own professionals, not outside agencies.
 Double curve our reply by saying we welcome an investigation of them.
 Start feeding lurid, blood sex crime actual evidence on the attackers to the press.
Don't ever tamely submit to an investigation of us. Make it rough, rough on attackers all the way.

Critics of Scientology cite this passage, among others (such as the widely documented Fair Game doctrine), to support their contentions that the church uses smear tactics to augment the effectiveness of legal threats.

Scientology court cases

Notable Scientology court cases include the following:

Cases before the European Court of Human Rights

 On April 5, 2007, the Church of Scientology of Moscow won a judgment against the Russian government establishing its right to recognition as a religious organization. The European Court held that the government's refusal of registration "had no lawful basis ... the Moscow authorities did not act in good faith and neglected their duty of neutrality and impartiality vis-à-vis the applicant's religious community."

Cases in the United States

Cases in the UK
 Bonnie Woods, a former member who began counseling people involved with Scientology and their families, became a target along with her husband Richard in 1993 when the Church of Scientology started a leaflet operation denouncing her as a "hate campaigner" with demonstrators outside their home and around East Grinstead. She and her family were followed by a private investigator, and a creditor of theirs was located and provided free legal assistance to sue them into bankruptcy. After a long battle of libel suits, in 1999 the church agreed in a settlement to issue an apology and pay £55,000 damages and £100,000 costs to the Woods.

Cases in Canada

Cases in France
 In 1978, L. Ron Hubbard, creator of Scientology, was convicted for illegal business practices, namely, making false claims about his ability to cure physical illnesses. He was sentenced to four years in prison, which was never served.
 In 2009, a case went to trial in France, after a woman claims to have been pressured into paying €21,000 ($29,400) to the Church of Scientology for lessons, books and medicines for her poor mental state accused the Church of Scientology of "organised fraud". Her lawyers argue that the church systematically seeks to make money through mental pressure and use scientifically dubious cures. Coincidentally, a large scale simplification of the laws in France occurred just prior to the beginning of the trial. Suspicion was raised as the new law revision forbids the dissolution of a legal entity, an unadvertised change among hundreds of others. Dissolution was the main sentence requested by the prosecutor against the Church of Scientology in this trial, becoming unlawful as the law changed. On October 27, 2009, a verdict was rendered: six members of the CoS in France, and the Church itself, were convicted of fraud. Four of these, including Alain Rosenberg, were given suspended prison sentences. The Scientology Celebrity Center in Paris, a Scientology bookstore, and all six individual convicts were ordered to pay fines. The plaintiff's request for dissolution of the Church was not fulfilled.

See also
 Scientology and the Internet
 Scientology in Germany
 Fair Game (Scientology)
 Scientology Timeline
 The Hole (Scientology)

References

External links

Church of Scientology
 
 
 

Critical and other sites

 
 
 

Research
 
 

 
Lawsuits
Copyright law
Abuse of the legal system
Scientology-related controversies